The Occult History of the Third Reich, narrated by Patrick Allen and directed by Dave Flitton, is a 1991 four-part History Channel documentary regarding the occult influences and history of Nazi Germany and early 20th century Germany.

Contents
The documentary was originally shown and released in four parts in 1991.
 Adolf Hitler
 The SS Blood and Soil
 The Enigma of the Swastika
 Himmler the Mystic

Television and DVD release
Following broadcast, it was subsequently re-released on DVD in 1998 by Madacy Occult History of Third Reich 1 and again in 2004 in four parts by Pagasus The Occult History Of The Third Reich: Volume 3.

Synopsis
The documentary contains mainly black-and-white as well as some color archival footage, with narration explaining the influences of alternative belief systems (occult, paganism, mysticism, etc.) on the Nazi ideology and Hitler's personal philosophy. It also documents the history and development of ideas and symbols used by the Nazi Party and of the Nazi eugenics program.

In the early 20th century, the young Adolf Hitler was just one of many German-speaking people attracted by a new Germanic mythology that combined ancient legends and esoteric cosmologies with cutting-edge theories of genetic science. In the hands of the Nazis, the result was a new ideology that saw racial purity as the key to human destiny.

This was a belief system of arcane rituals and potent symbols, with the ancient swastika appropriated for the Nazi cause. By the time of the Third Reich, Hitler and the Nazis had evolved an entirely new faith, complete with holy book, venerated relics, and a priestly elite in the form of Himmler's SS. It was a religion based on obedience, power, and the cult of the leader, with Hitler himself conceived in Messianic terms.

See also
 Guido von List
 Nazi mysticism
 Karl Spiesberger
 Wilhelm Wulff
 Nazis: The Occult Conspiracy

Further reading 
 Angebert, Jean-Michel, The Occult and the Third Reich: The Mystical Origins of Nazism and the Search for the Holy Grail, McGraw-Hill (1975). 
 Goodrick-Clarke, Nicholas, The Occult Roots of Nazism: Secret Aryan Cults and Their Influence on Nazi Ideology, New York University Press (1992).

External links
 
 

1991 television films
1991 films
American documentary television films
Documentary films about Nazi Germany
History (American TV channel) original programming
Occultism in Nazism
1990s American films